Flonheim is an Ortsgemeinde – a municipality belonging to a Verbandsgemeinde, a kind of collective municipality – in the Alzey-Worms district in Rhineland-Palatinate, Germany.

Geography

Location 
The municipality lies in the middle of Rhenish Hesse near the Rhine Valley. Through Flonheim flows the river Wiesbach.

Geology 
In Flonheim’s municipal area is an old sandstone quarry at which, until the earlier half of the 20th century, Flonheim sandstone was quarried.

Climate 
Yearly precipitation in Flonheim amounts to 532 mm, which is rather low, falling into the lowest tenth of the precipitation chart for all Germany. At 7% of the German Weather Service’s weather stations, even lower figures are recorded. The driest month is January. The most rainfall comes in June. In that month, precipitation is twice what it is in January. Precipitation hardly varies over the year. At 28% of the weather stations, lower seasonal swings are recorded.

Neighbouring municipalities 
Flonheim’s neighbours are Armsheim, Bornheim, Uffhofen (since 7 June 1969 amalgamated with Flonheim) and Wendelsheim.

History 
As early as Roman times, sandstone was being quarried in what is now Flonheim’s municipal area. Some sculptural finds are on display at the Alzey Museum, such as a Viergötterstein (a “four-god stone”, a pedestal on which a Jupiter Column was customarily stood). There has also been a wealth of grave finds from Frankish times, especially a princely grave from the 7th century furnished with weapons.

In 764, Flonheim had its first documentary mention as Flonenheim. In 960 Flonheim was mentioned as the seat of the Emichonen (later called the Counts of Flonheim). About 1133, Waldgrave Emich II endowed an Augustinian church canonical foundation (monastery), which was dissolved in 1554. About 1300, the village was fortified. Until the French Revolution (1792) Flonheim was the seat of a comital Amt.

In Flonheim stood an early postal station on the roughly 920 km-long Habsburg postal route running from Innsbruck to Mechelen (north of Brussels), which was run by the family Taxis. It is known that the postal station was running from 1506 to about 1558.

During building work, a fossilized sea cow was unearthed in Flonheim. This is now on display at the Senckenberg Museum in Frankfurt.

Amalgamations 
In the course of administrative reform, the two municipalities of Uffhofen and Flonheim were merged on 7 June 1969 into today’s municipality of Flonheim.

Politics

Municipal council 
The council is made up of 20 council members, who were elected at the municipal election held on 7 June 2009, and the honorary mayor as chairwoman.

The municipal election held on 7 June 2009 yielded the following results:

Coat of arms 
The municipality’s arms might be described thus: Quarterly, first and fourth sable a lion rampant guardant argent langued gules, second Or a lion rampant of the third armed and crowned of the second, and third Or two fish addorsed hauriant of the third.

Town partnerships 
 Villenauxe-la-Grande, Aube, France
 Schwepnitz, Saxony

Culture and sightseeing

Cinema 
In Flonheim is one of Germany’s oldest cinemas (1923), and until his death, Flonheim also had Germany’s oldest projectionist, Hans Frank (1915-2008).

Buildings 
The Evangelical parish church was built between 1882 and 1885 on the spot where once stood the Augustinian canonical foundation church, and inside it still has a ceramic-tile piece of flooring from the old monastery church.
Romanesque reliefs from about 1120 from the old monastery church can be found on a house on Langgasse (lane) and in the rectory garden. They are stylistically akin to reliefs in the southest vestibule at Mainz Cathedral.
The Catholic parish church is a Gothic Revival building of quarrystones, built between 1883 and 1885.
Town hall dating from 1733 with stair tower from 1587 (not pictured).
Former waldgraviate Amtshaus from 1750.
The Mennonite church in the outlying centre of Uffhofen is a plain, one-room structure from 1756, remodelled in the 19th century.

Regular events 
Wine market at the historic marketplace – last weekend in May
Wine festival: In September wine tasting at the producing vineyards during walking tours concluding with grilled treats with the wine.
Flonheimer Jahrmarkt (yearly market) – first weekend in July
Mühlentag (“Mill Day”) at the Geistermühle on Whitsunday and Whit Monday
Wine and art in Professor Eberhard Linke’s workshop and sculpture garden
Christmas Market on the first day of Advent

Economy and infrastructure

Transport 
The Autobahn A 61 with its Bornheim interchange runs by about 5 km away. The A 63 can be reached through the Autobahnkreuz Alzey, an Autobahn junction. Local public transport is limited to buslines run by Omnibusverkehr Rhein-Nahe, notably to the town of Alzey.

There was once a railway station on the Wiesbachtalbahn in Flonheim.

Education 
Primary school and Hauptschule

Famous people

Sons and daughters of the town 
Eva Pauser was Rhenish-Hessian Wine Queen in 2005/2006.
Denise Wagner was Flonheim Beer Queen in 2005/2006.
Susanne Reinemer was Wine Princess from 1995 to 1997
Verena Bechtluft was world nine-pin bowling champion in 2004.

References

External links 

Municipality’s official webpage 
Flonheim in the collective municipality’s Web pages 
Further information about Flonheim 
Flonheim-Uffhofen local history as PDF file (480 kb) 
Flonheim’s history and present 
Für Flonheim interessieren sich auch Gäste aus Japan in the Rhein Main Presse on 10 February 2004 

Rhenish Hesse
Alzey-Worms